State Route 135 (SR 135) is a primary state highway in the U.S. state of Virginia.  Known as College Drive, the state highway runs  from U.S. Route 17 (US 17) north to the entrance of Tidewater Community College, where the highway continues as SR 367, within the independent city of Suffolk.  In addition to providing access to the community college's Suffolk location, SR 135 connects US 17 with SR 164 and Interstate 664 (I-664).

Route description

SR 135 begins at an intersection with US 17 (Bridge Road) to the west of the village of Churchland.  The intersection is very close to the tripoint of the boundaries of the independent cities of Suffolk, Chesapeake, and Portsmouth.  SR 135 heads north as a four-lane divided highway and immediately has a partial diamond interchange that allows access to SR 164 (Western Freeway) to and from the east.  The state highway passes the Tri-cities Higher Education Center, a satellite campus of Old Dominion University, and passes through a commercial area.  SR 135 meets I-664 (Hampton Roads Beltway) at an oblique cloverleaf interchange; this interchange is the first junction for I-664 south of the Monitor-Merrimac Memorial Bridge-Tunnel.  The state highway reduces to two lanes for the final stretch to its northern terminus at the entrance of the Tidewater Community College's Regional Workforce Development Center and Truck Driver Training Site, which fronts Hampton Roads at Pig Point.  College Drive continues onto campus as SR 367.

Major intersections

References

External links

Virginia Highways Project: VA 135

135
State Route 135